Bahrain competed at the 2020 Summer Olympics in Tokyo. Originally scheduled to take place in the summer of 2020, the Games were postponed to 23 July to 8 August 2021, because of the COVID-19 pandemic. It was the nation's tenth consecutive appearance at the Summer Olympics.

Medalists

Competitors
The following is the list of number of competitors in the Games. Note that reserves in handball are not counted:

Athletics

Bahraini athletes further achieved the entry standards, either by qualifying time or by world ranking, in the following track and field events (up to a maximum of 3 athletes in each event):

Track & road events
Men

Women

Field events

Boxing 

Bahrain entered one male boxer into the Olympic tournament. Belarusian-born Danis Latypov topped the list of eligible boxers from Asia and Oceania in the men's super heavyweight division to secure a place on the Bahraini team based on the IOC's Boxing Task Force Rankings.

Handball

Summary

Men's tournament

Bahrain men's handball team qualified for the Olympics by winning the gold medal at the 2019 Asian Qualification Tournament in Doha, Qatar, signifying the nation's debut in the sport.

Team roster

Group play

Quarterfinal

Shooting

Bahrain entered one shooter at the games, after getting the allocation quotas.

Qualification Legend: Q = Qualify for the next round; q = Qualify for the bronze medal (shotgun)

Swimming

Bahrain received a universality invitation from FINA to send two top-ranked swimmers (one per gender) in their respective individual events to the Olympics, based on the FINA Points System of June 28, 2021.

References

Nations at the 2020 Summer Olympics
2020
2021 in Bahraini sport